Bandhe Hath is a 1973 Hindi-language film produced and written by O. P. Ralhan. It stars Amitabh Bachchan, Mumtaz in lead roles, with Ajit, Ranjeet, Madan Puri, Asit Sen, O. P. Ralhan, Tun Tun, Pinchoo Kapoor in another roles. The film's music is by R. D. Burman and the lyrics by Majrooh Sultanpuri.
The film is a remake of Shammi Kapoor film Mujrim (1958).

Synopsis
A thief named Shyamu (Amitabh Bachchan) who has made stealing his career decides to go straight after the death of his mentor (Madan Puri). On the run from police for committing a series of robberies in the past, he ends up in a village and he comes across a poet named Deepak (also Amitabh Bachchan) and comes to his aid. Taking advantage of the fact that Deepak is his lookalike he decides to steal his identity by killing him. However, he backs out of killing him when he discovers Deepak is already dying of an illness. After Deepak's death he decides to steal his identity and informs the police that Deepak is actually the thief Shyamu. However a police inspector (Ajit Khan) becomes suspicious that Shyamu is actually alive and masquerading as the poet Deepak.

The change in the life of now Deepak the poet, from Shyamu, is due to a stage artist and dancer, Mala Mumtaz (actress), who is exquisitely beautiful, as a woman and human being, and who falls in love with him, being part of the same stage company, Roop Kala Theatre. For her, he wants to finish his old identity fully, but finds out that Deepak had a love interest in Rajni (Kumud Chhugani), who is a women's rights activist and daughter of the same multi millionaire, Seth Harnaam Das,  in whose house, he as Shyamu the thief, had committed his last robbery, but had returned all the stolen articles to the police, except for a ring which he had gifted to Mala. He wants to retrieve the letters from Rajni, which Deepak had written to her, for fear, that the police will conduct a handwriting test on him with them, and woos Rajni. Mala is taken aback when she finds out the same, as also the real identity of now Deepak the poet, from Inspector Kumar. 
 
The story evolves into a society eye opener, of the transformation of a human being from the path of crime, to goodness, his re-acceptance in ideological cast, and is a Hindi cinema classic worth watching.

Cast
 Amitabh Bachchan as Shyamu / Deepak (Double Role)
 Mumtaz as Mala
 Ajit as Inspector Kumar 
 Ranjeet as Ranjeet
 Madan Puri as Shyamu's Mentor
 Gajanan Jagirdar as Seth Harnamdas
 Kumud Chuggani as Rajni 
 Anjana Mumtaz as Kamla 
 O. P. Ralhan as Preetam
 Tun Tun as Kavita
 Sardar Akhtar as Mala's Mother			
 Ram Mohan as Inspector Bedi
 Asit Sen as Roopkala Theatre Owner 
 Pinchoo Kapoor as Doctor

Soundtrack

References

External links 
 
 YouTube link 

Films scored by R. D. Burman
1973 films
Remakes of Indian films
1970s Hindi-language films